"Dread and the Fugitive Mind" is a song by the American thrash metal band Megadeth. It was released in 2001 as the second single from their ninth studio album, The World Needs a Hero.

Background 
"Dread and the Fugitive Mind" is about a thief wondering if there is a god.

"Dread and the Fugitive Mind" has been played 165 times live by Megadeth, the most out of any song on The World Needs a Hero. The song was a setlist mainstay on "Metal Tour of the Year 2022" and the tour for The Sick, the Dying... and the Dead!.

Track listing

Personnel 
Production and performance credits are adapted from the album liner notes, except where otherwise noted.

Megadeth
 Dave Mustaine – guitars, lead vocals
 David Ellefson – bass, backing vocals
 Jimmy DeGrasso – drums
 Al Pitrelli – guitars, backing vocals

Production
Produced by Dave Mustaine; Co-produced by Bill Kennedy
Mixed and engineered by Bill Kennedy
Assistant engineers – Mark Valentine, Lance Dean, Jay Goin, Greg Edenfield
Pro Tools – Chris Vrenna, Joe Bishara, James Murray, Sean Dever, Ken Mary, Lance Dean
Mastered by Tom Jensen

Charts

References 

2000 songs
2001 singles
Megadeth songs
Songs written by Dave Mustaine